Detour is Michael Brodsky's first novel.  It is the first person partly autobiographical<ref>Village Voice 2003 review</ref> account of an often bored film devotee going to Cleveland for medical school, making observations on everything in his daily life, either in a philosophical manner, or by comparing any given incident with some classic film scene, or both.  Halfway through, the narration is interrupted by Steve's story, also told in first person.  The novel eventually resumes with the original first person narrator, who finally decides medical school is not for him.

According to one critic,

EditionsDetour was republished in 1991 by Begos & Rosenberg, with a 1991 copyright, and no indication of any earlier edition, yet textually identical with the 1977 edition.Detour was republished in 2003 by Del Sol Press, in an expanded, rewritten edition.Detour was announced to be published in a German translation as Umwege'' by Suhrkamp Verlag but never actually appeared and Suhrkamp at present refuses to let either Brodsky or his original editor Michael Roloff, co-publisher at Urizen Books, know what transpired.

Reception

References

1977 American novels
American philosophical novels
Novels by Michael Brodsky
1977 debut novels
Novels set in Cleveland
Postmodern novels